Mundia is a town and a nagar panchayat in Badaun district in the Indian state of Uttar Pradesh.

Demographics
 India census, Mundia had a population of 6,242. Males constitute 53% of the population and females 47%. Mundia has an average literacy rate of 42%, lower than the national average of 59.5%: male literacy is 51%, and female literacy is 32%. In Mundia, 20% of the population is under 6 years of age.

Another meaning
Mundia is a village in Bisauli tahsil of Badaun district of Uttar Pradesh with a pin of 202521.

References

Cities and towns in Budaun district